Froggattella is a genus of ants in the subfamily Dolichoderinae. The genus contains two species found in Australia. Froggattella kirbii is fairly common, while Froggattella latispina is known only from two locations in South Australia.

The two species range from small to medium in size, where they are found foraging in distinct trails on low vegetation or small sized trees.

Species
 Froggattella kirbii (Lowne, 1865)
 Froggattella latispina Wheeler, 1936

References

External links

Dolichoderinae
Ant genera
Hymenoptera of Australia